Estonia has participated in all the World Athletics Indoor Championships since  1993. Estonia has won a total of 3 medals (2 silver, 1 bronze) and is 63rd on the all time medal table.

Summary

Medalists

2018
Estonia participated at the 2018 IAAF World Indoor Championships in Birmingham with 2 athletes, 1 male and 1 female.

See also
 Estonia at the World Championships in Athletics

External links
 Estonian Athletic Association

Nations at the World Athletics Indoor Championships
Indoor